"Crazy Story" is a song by American rapper King Von, released on December 6, 2018 as his debut single through Only the Family and Empire Distribution. The song is his breakout hit, and was followed by two sequels: "Crazy Story 2.0" and "Crazy Story, Pt. 3". All three singles appear on Von's mixtape Grandson, Vol. 1 (2019). The song has more than 
82 million views in his YouTube official channel, plus 70 millions on WorldStarHipHop channel on YouTube as of February 2023.

Composition and critical reception 
The song finds King Von rapping about his struggle in growing up in Chicago over a drill-style instrumental. "Crazy Story" received generally positive reviews from critics. Alphonse Pierre of Pitchfork praised Von's storytelling, especially the elements that make the story vivid.

Remix 
The official remix of the song is titled "Crazy Story (Remix)" or "Crazy Story 2.0" and features American rapper Lil Durk. It was released on May 3, 2019.

Charts

Crazy Story 2.0

Certifications

References 

2018 singles
2018 songs
Empire Distribution singles
King Von songs